Cathkin is a Scottish placename that now may mean:

 Cathkin, South Lanarkshire, a neighbourhood of Rutherglen near to the Braes, Scotland
 Cathkin Braes, the highest point in Glasgow, a site for mountainbikers and rallying point in the Radical War
 Cathkin High School, a state secondary school in Cambuslang near Cathkin
 Cathkin Park, a municipal park in Glasgow, formerly a major Scottish football ground (Third Lanark A.C.)
 Cathkin Park (1872–1903), an earlier ground of the above football club a short distance from the other
 Cathkin Peak, a South African mountain peak
 Cathkin, Victoria, a town in Australia
 Cathkin railway station,  now closed

See also 
 Catkin